The Central District of Meyami County is a district (bakhsh) in Meyami County, Semnan Province, Iran. At the 2006 census, its population was 20,473, in 5,626 families.   The District has one city: Meyami. The District has three rural districts (dehestan): Forumad Rural District, Kalat-e Hay-ye Sharqi Rural District, and Meyami Rural District.

References 

Districts of Semnan Province
Meyami County
2011 establishments in Iran